Bugaboo International B.V. is a Dutch design company that makes parental products such as pushchairs for infants and toddlers. Its products are available in 50 countries. Bugaboo employs over 1,200 people, working at headquarters in Amsterdam, The Netherlands or in one of the offices in the UK, Germany, Sweden, Italy, Spain, United States, France, Australia, South Korea, Japan, Shanghai China and in the assembly plant in Xiamen, China.

History

Bugaboo was founded in 1996 by Max Barenbrug and his then brother-in-law, Eduard Zanen, an entrepreneur and doctor, following an investment by Zanen. Barenbrug started the concept for Bugaboo as a graduation project two years earlier when he was studying at the Design Academy Eindhoven.

The first Bugaboo, the "Bugaboo Classic", was launched in Holland in 1999. In 2001, the "Bugaboo Frog" was launched in the United Kingdom and in 2002 in the United States, popularized by its appearance in an episode of the TV show Sex and the City.

In February 2018, Bugaboo was acquired by Bain Capital for an undisclosed amount. In 2019, Bugaboo released the Lynx stroller.

See also
 Baby transport

Notes and references

 Interview with Max Barenbrug: 

Manufacturing companies based in Amsterdam
Design companies of the Netherlands
Baby products
Design companies established in 1996
2018 mergers and acquisitions
Dutch companies established in 1996